John Grice (born 1954) is a male British sport shooter. A veteran trap shooter.

Sport shooting career
He represented England and won a bronze medal in the trap pairs with Bob Borsley, at the 1994 Commonwealth Games in Victoria, British Columbia, Canada.

References

1954 births
Living people
British male sport shooters
Commonwealth Games medallists in shooting
Commonwealth Games bronze medallists for England
Shooters at the 1994 Commonwealth Games
20th-century British people
Medallists at the 1994 Commonwealth Games